The 2022 Louisville City FC season is the club's eighth season of competition. Louisville City competes in the USL Championship, the second tier of professional soccer in the United States.

Background 

The previous season was impacted by COVID-19 pandemic, though to a lesser extent than the 2020 season. The main alteration was to the regular season schedule, which saw Louisville City play seven division opponents four times each to reduce travel distance and frequency. The U.S. Open Cup was also cancelled for the second straight year due to the effects of the pandemic. Louisville City also began the season with Lynn Family Stadium open to limited capacity crowds, before expanding to maximum capacity on June 12, 2021. Louisville City had its highest attendance of the season on that date with 12,115.

The team won the Central Division with a victory at Birmingham Legion FC on the final matchday of the season, and advanced through the playoffs before falling in extra time to Tampa Bay Rowdies in the Eastern Conference final. Standout right back Jonathan Gómez tallied eight assists and a pair goals on the year. After being named the league's Young Player of the Year and to the All-League First Team at the conclusion of the season, Gómez was transferred to Real Sociedad of Spain's La Liga, Louisville City's first direct transfer to a top-flight European club. Cameron Lancaster led Louisville City in scoring with 21 goals in all comps and was named to the All-League Second Team, while Brian Ownby was the team leader in assists with 10. Defender Sean Totsch was named to the All-League First Team for the second consecutive season.

In addition to Jonathan Gómez's transfer, a number of other players departed the club. Louisville City reloaded from a variety of sources, bringing in players from other USL Championship and Major League Soccer clubs, signing Louisville City Academy players, and picking up free agents from the European and collegiate ranks. Prior season loanee Jorge Gonzalez stayed with the team and signed a contract with Louisville City.

Current squad

Out on loan

Competitions

Preseason friendlies

USL Championship

Standings — Eastern Conference

Results summary

Match results
For the 2022 USL Championship season, divisional separation of clubs used in the 2021 season was dropped. Louisville City will compete within the Eastern Conference. They will also face eight cross-conference opponents, most for the first time in competitive matches: LA Galaxy II, Monterey Bay FC, Orange County SC, El Paso Locomotive FC, Sacramento Republic FC, and Rio Grande Valley FC.

USL Cup Playoffs

The top seven teams in each USL Championship conference advanced to the 2022 USL Championship Playoffs, with the conference winners each receiving a bye to the Conference Semifinals.  Louisville City entered the playoffs as the top seed out of the Eastern Conference.

U.S. Open Cup

Player statistics

Goals

Assists

Clean sheets

Disciplinary

References

External links 
 Louisville City

Louisville City FC seasons
Louisville City FC
Louisville City
Louisville City